SN 1990U was a type Ic supernova event in the nucleus of the  galaxy NGC 7479. It was discovered July 27, 1990 by the Berkeley Automated Supernova Search after reaching magnitude . Initially this was classified as a Type Ib supernova, but the weakness of the neutral helium absorption lines led to a reclassification.

References

External links
 Spectra on the Open Supernova Catalog
 Simbad
 Image SN 1990U

Pegasus (constellation)
Supernovae